Duarabazar Model High School is a secondary school located in  Dowarabazar Union, Dowarabazar Upazila of Sunamganj District in the division of Sylhet, Bangladesh.

The school includes 11 teachers and more than 500 students.

References

High schools in Bangladesh